Spilomela receptalis is a moth in the family Crambidae. It is found in Brazil (Parà) and Colombia.

References

Moths described in 1859
Spilomelinae